The 1985 IBF World Championships (World Badminton Championships) were held in Calgary, Canada, from June 10 to June 16, 1985. Following the results of the mixed doubles.

Qualification
 Andy Goode/Gillian Clark- Lee Deuk-choon/Kang Haeng-suk: 15:13, 15:5
 Shūji Matsuno/Michiko Tomita- Sozinho Guerra/Indira Bhikha: 15:2, 15:3
 Sung Han-kook/Hwang Hye-young- Rolf Rüsseler/Heidi Krickhaus: 15:8, 15:0
 Kim Moon-soo/Chung So-young- Graeme Robson/Toni Whittaker: 15:13, 15:7
 Leroy D'sa/Madhumita Bisht- Bob Gilmour/Barbara McKinley: 15:12, 15:8
 Pradeep Gandhe/Ami Ghia- Broddi Kristjansson/Thordis Ewald: 15:7, 15:6
 Dan Travers/Pamela Hamilton- Samson Egbeyemi/A. Onuoha: 15:7, 15:2
 Park Joo-bong/Yoo Sang-hee- S. Gondwe/Mary Mukangwa: w.o.
 Shinji Matsuura/Kimiko Jinnai- Benoît Pitte/Anne Meniane: 15:1, 15:5
 Ulf Johansson/ Gillian Martin- P. Baum/Dawn Race: 18:15, 15:11
 Bob MacDougall/Denyse Julien- Armando del Carpio/Carmen Bellido: 15:4, 15:4

Main stage

Section 1

Section 2

Final stage

References

1985 IBF World Championships
World Championships